In database theory, a multivalued dependency is a full constraint between two sets of attributes in a relation.

In contrast to the functional dependency, the multivalued dependency requires that certain tuples be present in a relation. Therefore, a multivalued dependency is a special case of tuple-generating dependency. The multivalued dependency plays a role in the 4NF database normalization.

A multivalued dependency is a special case of a join dependency, with only two sets of values involved, i.e. it is a binary join dependency.

A multivalued dependency exists when there are at least three attributes (like X,Y and Z) in a relation and for a value of X there is a well defined set of values of Y and a well defined set of values of Z. However, the set of values of Y is independent of set Z and vice versa.

Formal definition 
The formal definition is as follows:

Let  be a relation and let  and  be sets of attributes.

The multivalued dependency can be schematically depicted as shown below:

Example 

Consider this example of a relation of university courses, the books recommended for the course, and the lecturers who will be teaching the course:

Because the lecturers attached to the course and the books attached to the course are independent of each other, this database design has a multivalued dependency; if we were to add a new book to the AHA course, we would have to add one record for each of the lecturers on that course, and vice versa.
Put formally, there are two multivalued dependencies in this relation: {course}  {book} and equivalently {course}  {lecturer}.
Databases with multivalued dependencies thus exhibit redundancy. In database normalization, fourth normal form requires that for every nontrivial multivalued dependency X  Y, X is a superkey. A multivalued dependency X  Y is trivial if Y is a subset of X, or if  is the whole set of attributes of the relation.

Properties 
 If , Then 
The following also involve functional dependencies:
 If , then 

The above rules are sound and complete.

 A decomposition of R into (X, Y) and (X, R − Y) is a lossless-join decomposition if and only if X  Y holds in R.
 Every FD is an MVD because if X  Y, then swapping Y's between tuples that agree on X doesn't create new tuples.
 Splitting Doesn't Hold. Like FD's, we cannot generally split the left side of an MVD.But unlike FD's, we cannot split the right side either, sometimes you have to leave several attributes on the right side.
Closure of a set of MVDs is the set of all MVDs that can be inferred using the following rules (Armstrong's axioms):
Complementation: If X  Y, then X  R - Y
Augmentation: If X  Y and Z  W, then XW  YZ
Transitivity: If X  Y and Y Z, then X  Z - Y
Replication: If X  Y, then X  Y
Coalescence: If X Y and  W s.t. W  Y = , W  Z, and Z  Y, then X  Z

Definitions 
 full constraint A constraint which expresses something about all attributes in a database. (In contrast to an embedded constraint.) That a multivalued dependency is a full constraint follows from its definition, as where it says something about the attributes .
 tuple-generating dependency A dependency which explicitly requires certain tuples to be present in the relation.
 trivial multivalued dependency 1 A multivalued dependency which involves all the attributes of a relation i.e..

References

External links 
Multivalued dependencies and a new Normal form for Relational Databases (PDF) - Ronald Fagin, IBM Research Lab
On the Structure of Armstrong Relations for Functional Dependencies (PDF) - CATRIEL BEERI (The Hebrew University), MARTIN DOWD (Rutgers University), RONALD FAGIN (IBM Research Laboratory) AND RICHARD STATMAN (Rutgers University) 
On a problem of Fagin concerning multivalued dependencies in relational databases (PDF) - Sven Hartmann, Massey University

Data modeling
Database constraints